Charlie Beljan (born October 10, 1984) is an American professional golfer who plays on the PGA Tour.

Amateur career
Beljan was born in Mesa, Arizona. He won the 2002 U.S. Junior Amateur at the Atlanta Athletic Club in Johns Creek, Georgia. He also won the 2006 Arizona Amateur. Beljan played college golf at the University of New Mexico, where he won three times and was an All-American in 2007.

Professional career
After graduating from New Mexico Beljan turned professional in 2007. He played on the Gateway Tour from 2008 to 2011, winning seven times, and he led the money list in 2009. He qualified for the U.S. Open in 2008 and 2009, but missed the cut both times. He earned his 2012 PGA Tour card by finishing in a tie for 13th at 2011 PGA Tour Qualifying School.

Going into the 2012 Children's Miracle Network Hospitals Classic, the final Tour event of the season and the last chance for a Tour card, Beljan was 139th on the Tour's money list with eight cuts made in 21 tournaments. During the second round he suffered a panic attack on the course and needed medical assistance, leaving the course en route to a hospital after the second round. Despite recommendations not to play, Beljan persevered and led or tied for the lead during the third and fourth rounds. Beljan won by two strokes over Robert Garrigus and Matt Every, earning him a two-year exemption. Beljan finished 63rd on the money list. He also earned entry into invitationals reserved for the top-70 money earners, the season-opening Hyundai Tournament of Champions, and an invitation to the 2013 PGA Championship.

The win capped off a season for Beljan that included wrist surgery after Q School, marriage, fatherhood, and an earlier panic attack where he collapsed on an airplane on a flight home after the Reno-Tahoe Open. Beljan was the fourth rookie winner in 2012, after John Huh, Ted Potter Jr., and Jonas Blixt. Beljan nearly earned his second win at the 2013 Northern Trust Open, but made bogey on the second playoff hole.

Beljan had a medical extension on the PGA Tour until the Genesis Open in 2018. After this event, he lost his full membership of the Tour and was limited to Past Champion status for the remainder of the season.

Amateur wins
2002 U.S. Junior Amateur
2006 Arizona Amateur

Professional wins (10)

PGA Tour wins (1)

PGA Tour playoff record (0–1)

Gateway Tour wins (7)
2008 (1) Desert Summer Tournament #8
2009 (3) Desert Winter #4, Desert Winter #7, Desert Summer #1
2010 (1) Winter Series Championship
2011 (2) Tournament 10, Tournament 12

Other wins (2)
2013 (1) New Mexico Open
2019 (1) Arizona Open

Results in major championships

CUT = missed the half-way cut
"T" indicates a tie for a place

See also
2011 PGA Tour Qualifying School graduates

References

External links

American male golfers
New Mexico Lobos men's golfers
PGA Tour golfers
Golfers from Arizona
Sportspeople from Mesa, Arizona
1984 births
Living people